The Professional Football Researchers Association (PFRA) is an organization of researchers whose mission is to preserve and, in some cases, reconstruct professional American football history. It was founded on June 22, 1979 in Canton, Ohio by writer/historian Bob Carroll and six other football researchers and is currently headed by an executive committee led by its president, George Bozeka, and executive director Leon Elder.  Membership in the organization includes some of professional football's foremost historians and authors. The organization is based in Guilford, New York.

The PFRA publishes books and a bimonthly magazine, The Coffin Corner, devoted to topics in professional football history.  The organization also gives out awards each year for outstanding achievement in the field of football research.

The Coffin Corner

The Coffin Corner is a semimonthly magazine devoted to topics in professional football history.  PFRA members publish their research findings in the articles, regardless of prior writing experience.  In the case of newer authors and first-time contributors, the magazine's editors assist, anonymously, in helping develop the narratives for publication.  The $35.00 annual membership in the organization includes a subscription to six issues of The Coffin Corner, as well as access to the "Members Only" section of their website, which contains detailed research on a variety of pro football subjects.

PFRA Books 
In cooperation with McFarland & Company, the PFRA is now working on the third installment in its "Great Teams in Pro Football History" series, edited by George Bozeka.  Individual members of the association volunteer to author the different chapters, profiling in detail the players, the coaching staff, the preseason, regular season and postseason, and other elements of a team's season.  The 1966 Green Bay Packers: Profiles of Vince Lombardi's Super Bowl I Champions was released in 2016, and The 1958 Baltimore Colts: Profiles of the NFL's First Sudden Death Champions followed in 2018.  Writing is underway for the chapters of a book about the 1951 Los Angeles Rams season, which will be released in 2021.  The fifth book, about the 1964 Buffalo Bills season, will follow in 2024.

Committees and Research Projects

The PFRA maintains ongoing database projects, with committees of members who update the record as information develops, or as it's discovered in the course of research. Select committees may be disbanded as their work is completed.

All-America Football Conference (chair: Ken Crippen)
Hall of Very Good Committee The Hall of Very Good highlights outstanding players not in the Pro Football Hall of Fame. (chair: Andy Piascik)
Biography Committee Responsible for writing biographies of every NFL player. (chairs: Greg Tranter, Jeffrey J. Miller, George Bozeka)
Education Committee Collects and develops educational problems involving football for use in schools. (chair: Neal Golden)
Linescore Committee Responsible for compiling linescores for all professional games played since 1920. (chair: Gary Selby)
Gamebooks Committee The goal of the PFRA Gamebooks Committee is to collect gamebooks and play-by-play accounts for all of the games in NFL history. These can be a valuable tool for researchers, but acquiring them can be an arduous task. The goal is to share the collective efforts of a number of researchers and pool the results in one location, hopefully to foster future research. (chairs: Giovanni Malaty and Rupert Patrick)
Membership Committee For the PFRA's internal purposes.
Pre-NFL Pro Football Committee Researches all professional football prior to 1920, such as the Ohio League, Western Pennsylvania Professional Football Circuit, the Chicago and Philadelphia circuits, and the New York Pro Football League. (chair: Roy Sye)
Uniforms Compiles all information on NFL, AFL and AAFC uniforms from 1933 to the present. (chair: Tim Brulia)
Oral History Chronicles PFRA interviews with former NFL players. (chair: Ken Crippen)
NFL Officials Compiles a list of all NFL officials, their positions and their uniform numbers. (chair: Gary Najman-Vainer)

Hall of Very Good
The "Hall of Very Good" is a project done to highlight the best players and coaches not yet inducted into the Hall of Fame. The * indicates that person was inducted into the Pro Football Hall of Fame afterwards.

 2003 - Gino Cappelletti, Carl Eller*, Pat Fischer, Benny Friedman*, Gene Hickerson*, Jerry Kramer*, Johnny Robinson*, Mac Speedie*, Mick Tingelhoff*, Al Wistert 
 2004 - Gene Brito, John Brodie, Jack Butler*, Chris Hanburger*, Bob Hayes*, Billy Howton, Jim Marshall, Al Nesser, Dave Robinson*, Duke Slater*
 2005 - Maxie Baughan, Jim Benton, LaVern Dilweg, Pat Harder, Floyd Little*, Tommy Nobis, Pete Retzlaff, Tobin Rote, Lou Rymkus, Del Shofner
 2006 - Charlie Conerly, John Hadl, Chuck Howley, Alex Karras*, Eugene Lipscomb, Kyle Rote, Dick Stanfel*, Otis Taylor, Fuzzy Thurston, Dan Towler
 2007 - Frankie Albert, Roger Brown, Timmy Brown, Marshall Goldberg, Jim Lee Howell, Glenn Presnell, Dick Schafrath, Jake Scott, Ed Sprinkle*, Paul "Tank" Younger
 2008 - Dick Barwegan, Randy Gradishar, Bob Hoernschemeyer, Cecil Isbell, Buddy Parker, Spec Sanders, Jim Ray Smith, Billy Wilson
 2009 - Bruno Banducci, Harold Carmichael*, Blanton Collier, Boyd Dowler, Claude Humphrey*, Ken Kavanaugh, Verne Lewellen, Walt Sweeney
 2010 - Robert Brazile*, Ed Budde, Don Coryell, Ox Emerson, Chuck Foreman, Bob Gain, Riley Matheson, Jimmy Patton, Drew Pearson*, Ken Riley
 2011 - Ken Anderson, Cliff Branch*, Bobby Dillon*, Cliff Harris*, Harold Jackson, Andy Russell, Lou Saban, Tom Sestak, Jerry Smith
 2012 - Bill Bergey, Curley Culp*, Kenny Easley*, Lester Hayes, Jack Kemp, Eddie Meador, L. C. Greenwood, Ray Wietecha, Swede Youngstrom
 2013 - Erich Barnes, Mike Curtis, Roman Gabriel, Cookie Gilchrist, Bob Kuechenberg, Daryle Lamonica, Lemar Parrish, Donnie Shell*, Jim Tyrer
 2014 - Larry Brown, Nolan Cromwell, Larry Grantham, Charlie Hennigan, Harlon Hill, Winston Hill*, George Kunz, Ken Stabler*
 2015 - Alan Ameche, Rick Casares, Bill Forester, Rich Jackson, Chuck Knox, Ted Nesser, Gene Washington, 
 2016 - Gary Collins, Gale Gillingham, Jim Katcavage, Joe Klecko, Harvey Martin, Don Perkins, Duane Putnam, Isiah Robertson, Louis Wright
 2017 - Bobby Boyd, Todd Christensen, Joe Fortunato, Dave Grayson, Cornell Green, Dan Reeves, Bob Skoronski, 
 2018 - Lyle Alzado, Dick Anderson, Ken Gray, Lee Roy Jordan, Earl Morrall, Ralph Neely, Fred Smerlas 
 2019 - Joey Browner, Deron Cherry, Roger Craig, Abner Haynes, Joe Jacoby, Art Powell, Everson Walls, Ed White
2020 - Ottis Anderson, Jay Hilgenberg, Ed Jones, Ron McDole, Karl Mecklenburg, Richie Petitbon, Sterling Sharpe, Buddy Young
2021 - Grady Alderman, Russ Francis, Mike Kenn, Tony Latone, Stanley Morgan, John Niland, Clark Shaughnessy, Bill Stanfill, Bob Vogel, Abe Woodson

Ralph Hay Award
The Ralph Hay Award, named after the Canton Bulldogs owner whose Hupmobile Automobile showroom was the site of the NFL's first organizational meeting, is awarded for "lifetime achievement in pro football research and historiography."

Past winners have been:

 2021 - Joe Ziemba
 2020 - Joe Zagorski
 2019 - Rupert Patrick
 2018 - John Turney
 2017 – John Maxymuk
 2016 – Mark L. Ford
 2015 – Jack Clary
 2014 – Pete Fierle
 2013 – Cliff Christl 
 2012 – Chris Willis
 2011 – Ken Crippen
 2010 – Pete Palmer
 2009 – Bob Carroll
 2008 – Ralph Hickok
 2007 – Vince Popo
 2006 – Emil Klosinski
 2005 – John Gunn
 2004 – Jeffrey J. Miller
 2003 – John Hogrogian
 2002 – Ken Pullis
 2001 – Tod Maher
 2000 – Mel "Buck" Bashore
 1999 – Stan Grosshandler
 1998 – Seymour Siwoff
 1997 – Total Sports Publishing
 1996 – Don Smith
 1995 – John Hogrogian
 1994 – Jim Campbell
 1993 – Robert Van Atta
 1992 – Richard Cohen
 1991 – Joe Horrigan
 1990 – Bob Gill
 1989 – Joe Plack
 1988 – David Neft

Nelson Ross Award
The Nelson Ross Award is presented annually by the PFRA for "outstanding achievement in pro football research and historiography."

Past winners are:

 2021 - Jeffrey J. Miller and Greg Tranter, Relics: The History of the Buffalo Bills in Objects and Memorabilia
 2020 - Richard Bak, for his book When Lions Were Kings: The Detroit Lions and the Fabulous Fifties
 2019 - Chris Serb, for his book War Football: World War I and the Birth of the NFL
 2018 - Doug Farrar, for his book The Genius of Desperation: The Schematic Innovations that Made the Modern NFL
 2017 – Ralph Hickok, for his book, Vagabond Halfback: The Saga of Johnny Blood McNally
 2016 – James C. Sulecki, for his book, The Cleveland Rams: The NFL Champs Who Left Too Soon, 1936-1945
 2015 – Ted Kluck, for his book Three-Week Professionals: Inside the 1987 NFL Players’ Strike
 2014 – William J. Ryczek, for his book, Connecticut Gridiron: Football Minor Leaguers of the 1960s and 1970s
 2013 – Ivan Urena, for his book, Pro Football Schedules: A Complete Historical Guide 1933 to the Present
 2012 – Dan Daly, for his book, The National Forgotten League
 2011 – Mark Speck, for his book, ...and a Dollar Short: The Empty Promises, Broken Dreams and Somewhat-Less-Than-Comic Misadventures of the 1974 Florida Blazers
 2010 – Kate Buford, for her book, Native American Son: The Life and Sporting Legend of Jim Thorpe
 2009 – Robert Lyons, for his book, On Any Given Sunday: A Life of Bert Bell
 2008 – Sean Lahman, for his book, The Pro Football Historical Abstract
 2007 – Andy Piascik, for his book, The Best Show in Football: The 1946-1955 Cleveland Browns 
 2006 – Matthew Algeo, for his book, Last Team Standing: How the Steelers and the Eagles -- "The Steagles" -- Saved Pro Football During World War II 
 2005 – Chris Willis, for his book, Old Leather: An Oral History of Early Pro Football in Ohio, 1920-1935 
 2004 – Michael MacCambridge, for his book, America's Game: The Epic Story of How Pro Football Captured A Nation 
 2003 – Mark L. Ford, for his book, NFLX: NFL Exhibition Games 1950 to 2002
 2002 – Bob Gill, Steve Brainerd, and Tod Maher, for their book, Minor League Football, 1960-1985
 2001 – William J. Ryczek, for his book Crash of the Titans: The Early Years of the New York Jets and the AFL 
 2000 – Paul Reeths, for his book, "The USFL Chronicle"
 1999 – Joe Ziemba, for his book, When Football Was Football: The Chicago Cardinals and the Birth of the NFL 
 1998 – Keith McClellan, for his book, The Sunday Game: At the Dawn of Professional Football 
 1997 – Tod Maher & Bob Gill, for their book, The Pro Football Encyclopedia 
 1996 – John Hogrogian, for his book, All-Pros: The First 40 years 
 1995 – Phil Dietrich, for his book, Down Payments : Professional Football 1896-1930
 1994 – Rick Korch
 1993 – Myron J. "Jack" Smith Jr., for his book, Professional Football: The Official Pro Football Hall of Fame Bibliography 
 1992 – John M. Carroll, for his book, Fritz Pollard: Pioneer in Racial Advancement
 1991 – Tod Maher, for his book, Wiffle: The World Football League Chronicle
 1990 – Pearce Johnson, for his book, Professional Football in Rhode Island and Its National Connections
 1989 – Bob Gill
 1988 – Bob Braunwart

See also
Society for American Baseball Research (SABR)

References

External links
 

American football in the United States
American football in New York (state)
Sports professional associations based in the United States
Sports organizations established in 1979
1979 establishments in Ohio